Lyclene structa is a species of moth of the subfamily Arctiinae first described by Francis Walker in 1854. It is found in the southern half of Australia (including New South Wales and Queensland).

The wingspan is about 20 mm. Adults are dark yellow, with a number of dark brown zigzag lines across each forewing, and a broad black margin to each hindwing.

The larvae have been found on wallaby faeces. They are black and hairy.

References

Moths described in 1854
Nudariina
Moths of Australia